In taxonomy, Pseudovibrio is a genus of the Hyphomicrobiales.
Bacteria belonging to this genus have been often isolated from marine invertebrates and have been described to be metabolically versatile. Recent comparative genomic analyses revealed that these organisms have the genomic potential to produce a great array of systems to interact with their hosts, including type III, IV, VI secretion systems and different type of toxin-like proteins. Moreover, in their genomes several biosynthetic gene clusters producing potentially novel bioactive compounds were recently identified.

References

Further reading

Scientific journals

Scientific books

Scientific databases

External links

Hyphomicrobiales
Bacteria genera